Pseudochazara droshica is a species of butterfly in the family Nymphalidae. It is found from Drosh, southern Chitral and in the Shandur Pass in north-east Chitral.

Flight period 
The species is univoltine and on wing from late July to early August.

Food plants
Larvae feed on grasses.

References

 Satyrinae of the Western Palearctic - Pseudochazara droshica

Pseudochazara
Butterflies described in 1926